The first European to discover Chile was Ferdinand Magellan, in 1520, following the passage in the Strait which bears his name on a wall, at the southern tip of Latin America. Following the conquest of Aztec Empire by Hernán Cortés between 1518 and 1521, a new wave of territorial expansion occurs in the direction of the Inca Empire from 1532. This is done by Francisco Pizarro. The conquest of part of Chile started from 1535. This conquest is in a particular context (power struggle) and results in a partial settlement of the Spaniards in today's Chile.

Diego de Almagro's expedition (1536)

This first part of the conquest is conducted by one of the greatest lieutenants of Pizarro, Diego de Almagro. Is the rivalry between the two men that made Almagro start the conquest of the territory of Chile. Almagro was governor of one half of Peru; Pizarro governor of the other half, but at the same time viceroy of the entire colony. There was a dispute about who first reached the town of Cuzco that forced Almagro to embark in the conquest of Chile. After completing his conquest, he hoped to be appointed to the Viceroy of Peru by Philip II. His expedition was composed of several hundred Spanish (500) and several thousand Indian slaves. It traveled over 2500 km through the Andes and the Bolivian Altiplano where he lost many men. It was in March 1536 that he finally arrived in Chile, he began building a few strongholds in the country. The first contacts with the local natives were extremely violent. The Mapuche tribe saw the arrival of these foreigners on its territory as a catastrophe. The Battle of Reinohuelen ends the Spanish expedition. They are forced to turn back through the Atacama Desert. After his return, Almagro's disputes with Pizarro resurfaced. He was stripped of his title of governor and sentenced to death by Pizarro. He was beheaded in 1538.

Carmago's sight of Chiloé (1540)

Pedro de Valdivia's conquests (1541–1553)

It was in 1540 that a new phase of the conquest of Chile  begins . It was led by the most faithful lieutenants of Pizarro: Pedro de Valdivia. He will be also killed during the expedition. Valdivia unfortunately, due to the bad reputation of the country: little wealth and hostile Indians, could not recruit more than 150 Spanish soldiers and several thousand Indians in Peru as an expeditionary force. He chosen to take the same route Almagro had discovered on his way back: the Atacama Desert. Then he reached the valley of Copiapó where two of the largest cities in Chile, including the capital, were founded: Santiago del Nuevo Extremo (from 1810, date of independence, Santiago de Chile) in 1541 and La Serena in 1544. Spanish conquering force stationed in these towns by the time Francisco Pizarro sent reinforcements to Valdivia. Appointed governor of Chile 1550, he resumed his march to the south fighting against the Mapuche tribes but was killed during the capture of Fort Tucapel in 1553. Valdivia founded, however, other Chilean cities: Concepcion in 1550, Valdivia 1552, Los Confines and Santiago del Estero in 1553. One of his lieutenants continued the conquer after his death. The fight against the Mapuche continued until 1561 when the conquest was completed.

Pastene's explorations (1544)

See also 
Colonial Chile
Incas in Central Chile
Mapuche history

Exploration of Chile